Ulitsa Skobelevskaya is a station on the Butovskaya Line of the Moscow Metro system in Moscow, Russia. Opened on 27 December 2003 along with four other stations, it is named after the street that it serves, dedicated to Russian-Turkish war hero Mikhail Skobelev.

Two of the station's lobbies are located on Admiral Ushakov Boulevard and on Skobelev street. In the centre of the platform there are enclosed escalators and a lift for disabled access to the station.

The design of Ulitsa Skobelevskaya station is simple and almost identical to the four other stations to the south. It is located on an elevated viaduct with a light green and curvy canopy stretching over the entire platform. There are large sound and wind barriers on either side of the platform. The single island platform itself is 90m (295 feet) long, 7m (22 feet) wide, and 9.6 (31 feet) above the ground.

Moscow Metro stations
Railway stations in Russia opened in 2003
Butovskaya Line